The Leeds City Council elections were held on Thursday, 5 May 1988, with one third of the council and a vacancy in Headingley to be elected.

Following national patterns, the newly merged Social and Liberal Democrats, seen a substantial fall in vote to their lowest share in a decade, with former candidates standing against them as SDP in opposition to the merger. The SLD collapse was largely uniform, mostly transferring to Labour, except in northern wards - where support tended to disperse between the main parties and any minor candidate standing (usually Green or the aforementioned breakaway SDP) - or wards in which Independents stood. Importantly for the SLD, their support in the three wards they were defending notably withstood that collapse, although hopes of retaking Armley after their councillor turned Independent were dashed by large swings away to allow a Labour gain there (with Michael Meadowcroft later alleging racist campaigning by Labour). Elsewhere, the incumbent Independent in Pudsey South was comfortably re-elected, tripling his majority there. As the chief recipient of lost SLD support, Labour won their highest share of vote since the council's inception in 1973, and their greatest vote and majority on the council since 1980's re-warding.

Election result

This result has the following consequences for the total number of seats on the council after the elections:

Ward results

By-elections between 1988 and 1990

References

1988 English local elections
1988
1980s in Leeds